Noovo is a Canadian French-language terrestrial television network owned by the Bell Media subsidiary of BCE Inc. The network has five owned-and-operated and three affiliated stations throughout Quebec, although it can also be seen over-the-air in some bordering markets in the provinces of Ontario and New Brunswick. It can also be received in some other parts of Canada on cable television or direct broadcast satellite.

The network was launched in 1986 as Télévision Quatre-Saisons (TQS), and was known by that name until Remstar, which had bought the network in 2008, renamed it V on August 31, 2009. It was the namesake and flagship property of V Media Group (now known as Remstar Media Group), a separate company majority-owned by Remstar owner Maxime Rémillard (partially through Remstar). V was acquired by Bell Media in May 2020, after which it was renamed Noovo on August 31, 2020. The name "Noovo" is a stylized phonetic spelling of "nouveau", the French word for "new".

History
In 1968, the Canadian Radio-television and Telecommunications Commission (CRTC) first expressed interest in the establishment of a third French-language commercial television service in the province of Quebec to compete with Télévision de Radio-Canada and the loose association of independent stations that eventually became TVA. However the CRTC did not call on applications for licences.

In 1972, the CRTC said it was prepared to receive licence applications in order to authorize a third commercial television service in Quebec, although it was not until 1974 when the CRTC granted licences to Télé Inter-Cité Québec Ltée. to operate TV stations in Montreal (channel 29) and in Quebec City (channel 2). Télé Inter-Cité found itself unable to launch the network due to materials shortages and delays in equipment delivery; the CRTC granted a time extension to 1976. Civitas Corp., owner of several radio stations in Quebec and a denied applicant for the same channels a year earlier, filed to buy Téle Inter-Cité, but the CRTC denied the purchase and noted that the proposal to reduce local programming commitments substantially altered the original accepted application. Unable to go forward due to what it called "economic reasons", the firm surrendered the licences for revocation in 1976.

On November 15, 1984, the CRTC launched another call for applications in response to a bid from Cogeco. In 1985, it held public hearings in Montreal to examine competing applications from partners Cogeco Inc. (60.3%) and Moffat Communications (39.7%), and another application by the Pouliot family, owners of Montreal's CTV affiliate, CFCF-TV and radio stations CFCF (later CINW, now defunct) and CFQR-FM (now CKBE-FM). Both applications applied to launch television stations in Montreal and Quebec City. On September 6 of that year, the CRTC approved the application of the Pouliot family and its company, Réseau de Télévision Quatre-Saisons Inc., noting its existing facilities in Montreal and more realistic revenue projections compared to Cogeco. TQS was authorized to operate a French-language TV station in Montreal with an effective radiated power of 566,000 watts on channel 35. The CRTC initially denied the Quebec City bid on grounds of insufficient local advertising revenue; it was, however, allowed to set up a full-time rebroadcaster of the Montreal station there.

The network launched on September 7, 1986, as Télévision Quatre-Saisons ("Four Seasons Television"). The flagship was CFJP-TV in Montreal, with CFAP-TV in Quebec City as a full-time rebroadcaster. The network had affiliates in five other cities. As part of the launch, the existing expansion plans to add two storeys to the CFCF building were expanded with another two floors. The network—already lean, employing 125 additional personnel on top of CFCF's 500—spent most of its earlier years in severe financial trouble. At one point, the revenues from CFCF-TV were all that were keeping the network afloat. It was, however, able to launch affiliates in Val-d'Or in 1987 and Rivière-du-Loup in 1988, as well as upgrade its Quebec City rebroadcaster to a full-fledged station in 1989. In its early years, it was known for advertising in English on its then-sister radio stations.

In 1995, the Pouliots sold their media holdings to Quebec cable company Vidéotron, who already owned TVA, Quebec's other private commercial network. Due to monopoly ownership concerns, Vidéotron immediately turned around and sold TQS to Quebecor, a newspaper publisher. Around this time, the network began branding primarily as "TQS"; for its first decade on the air, most verbal references had used "Quatre-Saisons."

Quebecor acquired Vidéotron in 2001, and put TQS back on the market. Later in 2001, TQS was bought by a joint venture of CTVglobemedia (then known as Bell Globemedia) and Cogeco, another cable company. Cogeco owned a 60 percent controlling interest in the venture and handled most of operations, while CTVglobemedia owned 40 percent. The acquisition, in a sense, reunited it with CFCF, which had been bought by CTV a year earlier.

Bankruptcy protection

On December 18, 2007, TQS filed for bankruptcy protection. At this point the network was given 30 days in which to reorganize and revamp itself, with the goal of finding a viable solution to pay off its creditors. On January 16, 2008, a judge extended the grace period for an additional 45 days.

Montreal's newspaper La Presse reported on January 15 that Rogers Communications and RNC Media were each interested in acquiring some individual stations within the network, although RNC Media later denied the report and Rogers declined to comment. On February 25, 2008, the network confirmed that it had received four purchase bids, although it did not disclose the identities of the bidders.

Remstar's takeover 
On March 10, 2008, the Quebec Superior Court approved the sale of TQS to Remstar Corporation, a Montreal-based television and film producer and distributor. Creditors, who were owed more than $33 million, voted to accept the Remstar proposal in May. The CRTC approved the application on June 26, 2008.

Remstar announced on April 23, 2008, that 270 jobs would be cut at TQS, while the information services division would be abolished entirely — thus eliminating all newscasts from the network starting in September 2008. While the CRTC ordered Remstar to retain local news programming on the network, it did take the network's precarious financial situation into account by allowing a reduced amount of local news programming until the network's licence renewal hearing in 2011.

At the network's fall upfronts presentation for 2009, the network announced a repositioning plan, including a shedding of the TQS moniker and its black sheep logo in favour of the name "V", complete with a black-and-gold circle logo with a stylized letter V.  The V name reflected the channel's new mission of "vedettes" (stars), "vitesse" (speed), "voyages" (trips), and "vice ou vérité" (vices or truths).

The new program lineup included the daily news and discussion programs Le show du matin, hosted by Gildor Roy, and Dumont 360, hosted by Mario Dumont. V's rebranding took effect on August 31, 2009 at 6 am ET after the infomercial block.

Sale to Bell Media 

In July 2019, V Media Group announced that the network would be sold to CTVglobemedia's successor Bell Media pending CRTC approval, leaving the company to focus on its specialty channels Elle Fictions and Max. Bell proposed the addition of expanded in-house news programming, and will also provide advertising and master control services for Elle Fictions and Max.

The sale was approved on April 3, 2020; as a condition of the purchase, the CRTC stated that all five V stations must air five hours of local programming per-week through the 2020-2021 broadcast year, and expanding to eight-and-a-half hours per-week in Montreal and Quebec City by 2021-2022. At least half of all local programming must be locally-reflective. The sale was closed on May 15, 2020.

On August 19, 2020, Bell Media announced that the network would be rebranded as Noovo on August 31, taking its name from V's streaming platform of the same name.

Programming

The network has long been a distant third in the ratings to TVA and Ici Radio-Canada Télé. During the analogue era, most of its affiliates operated on the UHF band, and operated at moderate-to-low power compared to their TVA and Radio-Canada counterparts. Even in digital, most V affiliates do not have nearly the reach of their TVA and Radio-Canada counterparts. However, it has produced a number of major hit series in Quebec.

News
From the network's launch to its 2008 restructuring, the nightly Le Grand Journal formed the core of Noovo's news programming when it was named TQS. As with the channel per-se, Le Grand Journal failed to establish itself as a hard competitor to the very popular TVA and Radio-Canada newscasts, trying on several different formats to mixed success; however, it launched the careers of many Quebec TV news presenters, which would later land bigger jobs at other radio and TV outlets. The newscast would become a factor on the ratings when popular anchor and political commentator Jean-Luc Mongrain was hired as lead presenter, and the show adopted a harded-edge, tabloid and more aggressive approach, with a mix of hard news, commentary and heavy viewer interaction. He anchored the program from 1999 until its final edition aired on August 29, 2008. Benoît Dutrizac also anchored a 10 p.m. news talk show, Dutrizac, in the later half of the 2000s.

News programming continued in a reduced form on V, however, outsourced to independent producer ADN5. News summaries of approximately three minutes were inserted into the network's morning and noontime programming, along with a 30-minute newscast weekend evenings. In 2012, the provision on news programming was taken over by a newly-formed production division of Montreal-based publishing company Transcontinental, which took over the production of these updates, alongside producing a newly-created news-oriented morning show, Ça commence bien !, which attempted to attract viewers away from TVA's Salut, Bonjour! by showcasing content from the group's print and magazine brands. Even after suffering three different host transitions and numerous format changes to make it look closer to its rival, the show would be ultimately unsuccessful and eventually cancelled in 2015. By 2017, the network's news programming evolved after production was taken over by another producer, Attraction Images, now as a full-fledged half-hour bulletin under the title NVL (an abbreviation of "nouvelles", the French term for news), featuring a voiceover anchorless format that blended both network-wide and regionalized news reports similar to the current format of CityNews on the English Canadian Citytv network.

As part of the sale to Bell Media, the company stated that it planned to add in-house newscasts on all five O&O stations, with 90 minutes per-day on weekdays in Montreal and Quebec City, 60 minutes elsewhere, and half-hour weekend newscasts in all markets. On March 11, 2021, Bell announced the details of its revamp of the network's news programming under the title Le Fil. The new in-house program, which replaced the outsourced NVL, debuted on March 29, airing twice daily on weekdays: an hour-long news block at 5 p.m., with a half-hour national edition anchored by Noémi Mercier from the Bell Media building at Papineau Avenue in Montreal, followed by half-hour regional editions anchored by Mercier in Montreal, and by Lisa-Marie Blais in Quebec City; and a half-hour block at 10 p.m., consisting of ten minutes of national headlines anchored by Michel Bherer, followed by 20 minutes of regional news anchored by Bherer in Montreal and by Blais in Quebec City. On weekends, a single national edition airs at 9 a.m., structured more as a newsmagazine than as a newscast, anchored by Meeker Guerrier in Montreal. The network's other owned-and-operated stations carry their own regional editions, all broadcast from a centralised studio in Quebec City with Blais anchoring, but still featuring footage and two-ways from locally-based reporters; its affiliate stations will continue to produce their own local newscasts in lieu of the regional editions.

Lacking the resources of its well-established competitors, Noovo is leveraging the resources of the Énergie, Rouge and Boom-branded local radio stations owned by Bell Media to complement its own reporting; the combined resources are being promoted under the Noovo Info moniker. Le Fil has a looser style than its competitors' newscasts, and places a larger focus upon a personality-led and more informal presentation, longer-form reporting, human interest stories, heavy analysis and commentary of stories, and heavy viewer interaction on social media.

Sports
Noovo has long aired a nighttime sports show, beginning with Sports Plus (1986–1998), then 110% (1998–2009), followed by L'attaque à 5 (2009–2010).

Its carriage of live sporting events began with Super Bowl XXI in 1987. It has carried games of the National Hockey League, including the Quebec Nordiques from 1988 to 1994 and the Montreal Canadiens from 1994 to 2002.  It also aired games of the Montreal Expos from 1994 to 1998. Noovo carries boxing events organized by Groupe Yvon Michel.

In February 2005, the network acquired rights to the 2010 Winter Olympics and 2012 Summer Olympics as part of Canada's Olympic Broadcast Media Consortium (a joint venture of CTVglobemedia and Rogers Media) as the French broadcast television partner, in partnership with RDS (a sister via CTVglobemedia's stake at the time). It shared morning coverage of the 2010 Winter Olympics with RDS, followed by its own afternoon and evening programming. As the network's carriage was limited outside of Quebec (unlike previous rights holder Télévision de Radio-Canada), the non-profit public affairs network CPAC (which has must-carry status nationwide) received special authorization from the CRTC to simulcast the coverage in order to ensure nationwide availability.

Movies
The network is known to many viewers for Bleu Nuit, a showcase of softcore pornography which formerly broadcast late Saturday nights, similar to The Baby Blue Movie that once aired on Toronto's Citytv.

Prime time
The network's prime time schedule currently consists predominantly of reality and non-fiction programming, scheduled around Julie Snyder's nightly talk show La Semaine des 4 Julie at 9 p.m. Scripted entertainment programming currently consists primarily of dubbed versions of English Canadian or American comedy or drama series, rather than original francophone comedy or drama; however, a few Quebec-produced comedy or drama series are also broadcast, including Pour toujours, plus un jour, Mon ex à moi, Entre deux draps and Max et Livia.

Programming outside Montreal and Quebec City
Since the rebranding of the TQS network to V, on August 31, 2009, V's three owned and operated stations (O&Os) outside Montreal and Quebec City have dropped all non-network programming and become de facto repeaters of flagship CFJP-DT in Montreal. Unlike O&O stations, non-owned affiliates of the network, such as CFGS-DT in Gatineau/Ottawa, CJPC-DT in Rimouski, CFTF-DT in Rivière-du-Loup and CFVS-DT in Val-d'Or/Rouyn-Noranda, continue to broadcast local programming.

Coverage
Unlike TVA, Noovo does not have mandatory cable carriage rights outside Quebec, but may be offered at a cable company's discretion if there is a sufficient local market for French-language television programming. Consequently, the network is not widely available outside Quebec, although some communities in Ontario, New Brunswick and Nova Scotia receive Noovo affiliates on cable.

CFGS-DT in Gatineau is part of the Ottawa television market, and is carried in both analogue and digital on cable systems in nearly all of Eastern Ontario. Eastlink systems in Northeastern Ontario also carry CFGS in both analogue and digital. Rogers Cable systems in Central and Southwestern Ontario and the Greater Toronto Area, offer CFGS on their digital tier. CFTF-DT in Rivière-du-Loup has a rebroadcaster in Edmundston, New Brunswick—the network's only over-the-air transmitter outside Quebec—and is carried in both analogue and digital across most of northern New Brunswick.

To ensure that the network's coverage of the 2010 Winter Olympics reached francophone viewers outside Quebec, its coverage was simulcast on CPAC, which has mandatory carriage on the basic service of all Canadian cable and satellite providers, from February 12 to 28, 2010.

Noovo stations 
Notes:
1) All Noovo owned-and-operated stations signed on with the network in 1986;

Owned-and-operated stations

Affiliated stations

Identity and slogans
Beginning in 1997, TQS branded itself as le mouton noir de la télé, a slogan that could have served as the network's acknowledgment (or perhaps a badge of pride) that its history of financial difficulties, edgy programming, and limited availability outside Quebec had not always given it a prestigious place in the TV industry or in the eyes of the viewing public. The black sheep slogan was discontinued with the network's rebranding from TQS to V at the end of August 2009.

1987-1989: On grandit ensemble! (We grow together!)
1989-1995: TQS Au coeur de l'action! (TQS in the middle of action!)
1990: Voyez comme c'est bon! (See what's good!)
1995-1997: Allumée! (Turned on!) (Literally, "Lit up!")
1997-2007, 2008-2009: Le mouton noir de la télé (The black sheep of television)2007: Parce que vous êtes... différent! (Because you are... different!)2009-2010: Laissez-vous divertir (Let yourself be entertained), to coincide with the rebranding to V on August 31, 2009.
2010: Le divertissement à la puissance V (Entertainment with power, V)''

Revenue

Noovo has a 21% revenue share of the French-speaking private television market. The private francophone sector generates revenue of $361 million which equates to $75 million for Noovo.

See also
List of French-language Canadian television series
Television in Quebec
Culture of Quebec

References

External links
 
V history at Canadian Communications Foundation

 
Bell Media networks
Companies based in Montreal
1986 establishments in Quebec
Television channels and stations established in 1986